The 1929 All-Pacific Coast football team consists of American football players chosen by various organizations for All-Pacific Coast teams for the 1929 college football season. The organizations selecting teams in 1934 included the Associated Press (AP), the Newspaper Enterprise Association, and the United Press (UP).

All-Pacific Coast selections

Quarterback
 Marshall Duffield, USC (AP-1; UP-1)
 Russ Saunders, USC (NEA-1)

Halfbacks
 Benny Lom, California (AP-1; NEA-1; UP-1)
 Merle Hufford, Washington (AP-1; NEA-1)
 Stennett, St. Mary's (UP-1)

Fullback
 Charles O. Smalling, Stanford (NEA-1; UP-1)
 Elmer Schwartz, Washington State (AP-1)

Ends
 Francis Tappaan, USC (AP-1; NEA-1; UP-1)
 Donald "Mush" Muller, Stanford (AP-1; NEA-1)
 Norton (UP-1)

Tackles
 Austin Colbert, Oregon (AP-1; NEA-1)
 George Ackerman, St. Mary's (AP-1; UP-1)
 M. Shields, Oregon (NEA-1 [guard]; UP-1)
 Paul Schwegler, Washington (NEA-1) (College Football Hall of Fame)

Guards
 Schwarz, California (AP-1; NEA-1; UP-1)
 Nathan Barrager, USC (AP-1; UP-1)
 Shields, Oregon (NEA-1)

Centers
 Roy Riegels, California (AP-1; NEA-1; UP-1)

Key

AP = Associated Press

NEA = Newspaper Enterprise Association, "compiled from selections by sports writers of NEA client newspapers"

UP = United Press

Bold = Consensus first-team selection by at least two of the AP, NEA and UP

See also
1929 College Football All-America Team

References

All-Pacific Coast Football Team
All-Pacific Coast football teams
All-Pac-12 Conference football teams